Jenny Rossander (born 27 January 1990), known by the stage name Lydmor, is a Danish singer-songwriter. She also works as a producer and film score composer.

Discography 
Adapted from Spotify.

Studio albums 

 A Pile Of Empty Tapes (2012)
 Seven Dreams of Fire with Bon Homme (2015)
 Y (2016)
 I Told You I'd Tell Them Our Story (2018)
 Capacity (2021) – No. 26 Danish Albums Chart
 Nimue (2022)

Extended plays 

 She Moves – Acoustic EP (2014)
 The Red Acoustic STC Session (2016)

Singles 

 "Things We Do for Love" (2015)
 "Dream of Fire" (2015)
 "Missed Out on Disco" (2016)
 "Helium High" (2017)
 "二 Money Towers" (2018)
 "三 Killing Time" (2018)
 "四 Claudia" (2018)
 "Vild" (2019)
 "LSD Heart" (2019)
 "Guilty (Kill Me)" (2019)
 "Someone We Used to Love" (2020)
 "If You Want Capacity" (2020)
 "The Gadget Song" (2020)

References

1990 births
Living people
Danish film score composers
Singers from Copenhagen